Axinidris occidentalis is a species of ant in the genus Axinidris. Described by Shattuck in 1991, the species is endemic to Liberia, and is known to live in habitats that other Axinidris ants prefer.

References

Axinidris
Hymenoptera of Africa
Insects described in 1991